The boys' 110 metres hurdles competition at the 2010 Youth Olympic Games was held on 17–21 August 2010 in Bishan Stadium.

Schedule

Results

Heats

Finals

Final C
Wind: +0.2 m/s

Final B
Wind: 0.0m/s

Final A
Wind: +0.1 m/s

External links
 iaaf.org - Men's 110m hurdles
 

Athletics at the 2010 Summer Youth Olympics